The Joel Smith House is a historic house at the northeast corner of the junction of United States Route 167  and County Route 5 in rural Union County, Arkansas.  Built , this two-story vernacular I-house was the home of Joel Smith, one of the first white settlers of Union County.  The house is a rare surviving early example of a typical colonial-style house with matching shed-roof side porches.  The property is also thought likely to yield archaeological finds useful in assessing and understanding frontier life in the area.

The house was listed on the National Register of Historic Places in 1990.

See also
National Register of Historic Places listings in Union County, Arkansas

References

Houses on the National Register of Historic Places in Arkansas
Houses completed in 1840
Houses in Union County, Arkansas
National Register of Historic Places in Union County, Arkansas
1840 establishments in Arkansas
I-houses in Arkansas
Colonial Revival architecture in Arkansas